Tyla Nathan-Wong (born 1 July 1994) is a New Zealand professional rugby sevens representative and two-time Olympic medalist. She became a silver medalist at the 2016 Summer Olympics in Rio de Janeiro and won a gold medal at the 2020 Summer Olympics in Tokyo.

Biography 
In 2015 and 2019, Nathan-Wong was named New Zealand Sevens Player of the Year. She began playing rugby when she attended Lynfield College. She is of the Ngāpuhi tribe, and is also of Chinese and European descent. In 2012 and 2013, she won the Junior Māori Sportswoman of the Year award and was a finalist for the same award in 2014.

Nathan-Wong was selected for the women's sevens team to the 2016 Summer Olympics.

In 2018, Nathan-Wong and her team won both the 2018 Commonwealth Games held on the Gold Coast in Australia, as well as the Rugby World Cup Sevens in San Francisco, United States.

In 2019, Nathan-Wong was nominated as a World Rugby Women's Sevens Player of the Year having completed the season as the top goal kicker in the tournament.  She joined the Blues for the inaugural Super Rugby Aupiki competition.

Nathan-Wong was named in the Black Ferns Sevens squad for the 2022 Commonwealth Games in Birmingham. She won a bronze medal at the event.

Nathan-Wong got her first Black Ferns XV's call up after she was selected for the Laurie O’Reilly Cup Test series against Australia. She debuted for New Zealand on 20 August 2022 against Australia at the Orangetheory Stadium in Christchurch.

References

External links
 Black Ferns Profile
 Black Ferns Sevens Profile
 
 

1994 births
New Zealand female rugby union players
New Zealand international rugby union players
New Zealand female rugby sevens players
New Zealand women's international rugby sevens players
New Zealand Māori rugby union players
Rugby sevens players at the 2016 Summer Olympics
Olympic rugby sevens players of New Zealand
Living people
Touch footballers
Ngāpuhi people
New Zealand Māori sportspeople
Olympic silver medalists for New Zealand
Olympic medalists in rugby sevens
Medalists at the 2016 Summer Olympics
New Zealand sportspeople of Chinese descent
Rugby sevens players at the 2018 Commonwealth Games
Commonwealth Games rugby sevens players of New Zealand
Commonwealth Games gold medallists for New Zealand
Commonwealth Games medallists in rugby sevens
People educated at Lynfield College
Rugby sevens players at the 2020 Summer Olympics
Olympic gold medalists for New Zealand
Medalists at the 2020 Summer Olympics
20th-century New Zealand women
21st-century New Zealand women
Rugby sevens players at the 2022 Commonwealth Games
Medallists at the 2018 Commonwealth Games
Medallists at the 2022 Commonwealth Games